Parapenetretus is a genus of ground beetles in the family Carabidae. There are at least 20 described species in Parapenetretus, found mainly in China.

Species
These 20 species belong to the genus Parapenetretus:

 Parapenetretus barkamensis Zamotajlov & N.Ito, 2000 
 Parapenetretus caudicornis (Kurnakov, 1963) 
 Parapenetretus daliangensis (Zamotajlov; Sciaky & Ito, 2000) 
 Parapenetretus farkaci (Zamotajlov; Sciaky & Ito, 2000) 
 Parapenetretus kabaki Zamotajlov, 2002 
 Parapenetretus kasantsevi (Zamotajlov & Sciaky, 1999) 
 Parapenetretus medvedevi Zamotajlov & Sciaky, 2006 
 Parapenetretus microphthalmus (Fairmaire, 1889) 
 Parapenetretus microps Zamotajlov & Sciaky, 1996 
 Parapenetretus nanpingensis Zamotajlov & Sciaky, 1996 
 Parapenetretus pavesii Zamotajlov & Sciaky, 1996 
 Parapenetretus pilosohumeralis Zamotajlov, 1993 
 Parapenetretus saueri Zamotajlov & Sciaky, 1996 
 Parapenetretus selaensis Zamotajlov & Wrase, 2006  (India)
 Parapenetretus shimianensis Zamotajlov, 2002 
 Parapenetretus subtilis Zamotajlov & Heinz, 1998 
 Parapenetretus szetschuanus (Jedlicka, 1959) 
 Parapenetretus wenxianensis Zamotajlov & Sciaky, 2006 
 Parapenetretus wittmeri Zamotajlov, 1992  (Bhutan)
 Parapenetretus xilinensis (Zamotajlov & Wrase, 1997)

References

Carabidae